{{safesubst:#invoke:RfD||2=ASDFGH|month = March
|day =  4
|year = 2023
|time = 23:56
|timestamp = 20230304235612

|content=
REDIRECT QWERTY

}}